Phoenix Racing is the name of:

Phoenix Racing (NASCAR team) (established in 1990), defunct American racing team
Phoenix Racing (German racing team) (established in 1999), German racing team